Ord Minnett is an Australian wealth management company.

History
Ord Minnett was founded in 1951 by Charles Ord and Jack Minnett. In 1969, Bankers Trust and Ord Minnett formed BT-Ord, a merchant bank with Ord Minnett having a 60% shareholding. Ord Minnett sold out to Bankers Trust in 1972. 

Westpac purchased a 50% shareholding in July 1984, before exercising an option to take full ownership in April 1987. Westpac sold out in August 1993, with Jardine Fleming and staff each owning 50%. Australian Wealth Management purchased a 70% shareholding in May 2008 with JPMorgan Chase, that had purchased Jardine Fleming, retaining 30%. In September 2019 Ord Minnett was sold in a management buyout.

References

Companies based in Sydney
Financial services companies established in 1951
JPMorgan Chase
Westpac
1951 establishments in Australia